Wólka Pytowska  is a settlement in the administrative district of Gmina Kodrąb, within Radomsko County, Łódź Voivodeship, in central Poland.

The settlement has a population of 15.

References

Villages in Radomsko County